Çıfıtkalesi Islet (literally "Jewish Castle Island") is an uninhabited Aegean islet in Turkey.

In antiquity the islet was connected to the mainland and was called Myonessus (meaning mouse island). Currently, the connection has been broken, but the sea level is shallow and it is possible to walk to the islet. Parts of the defensive wall are preserved on the island.

References

Aegean islands
Islands of Turkey
Islands of İzmir Province
Seferihisar District
Ancient Greek archaeological sites in Turkey